The 1954 Kilkenny Senior Hurling Championship was the 60th staging of the Kilkenny Senior Hurling Championship since its establishment by the Kilkenny County Board.

On 10 October 1954, Slieverue won the championship after a 6-05 to 4-03 defeat of Tullaroan in the final. It was their first ever championship title. It remains their only championship title.

Results

Final

References

Kilkenny Senior Hurling Championship
Kilkenny Senior Hurling Championship